Hurst Green is a small village in the Ribble Valley district of Lancashire, England, connected in its history to the Jesuit school, Stonyhurst College.

History
 
With the founding of Stonyhurst Hall, by Richard Shireburn in 1592, the hamlet of Hurst Green (about a mile away) began to develop, as often happened after the building of manor houses. The hamlet's development continued once the college was founded in 1794, and by the early 20th century the village was about the size it is now (approximately 500 residents).

There is a distinctive war memorial to the First and Second World Wars bearing the names of soldiers from the area who died. This is situated near the village green. At the other side of the green stands St Peter's Guild Club, a Catholic social club which has existed for well over 200 years.

Shireburn donated the impressive and distinctive almshouses to the village. These almshouses were originally on Longridge Fell but moved to Avenue Road.

The presence of at least two old bobbin mills bear witness to the small cotton industry that existed here. However, Hurst Green is a community now mainly based on farming and tourism - with some people working at the local college and many more commuting to local towns.

In the 1970s the village had three shops, but these have closed over the last few years. However, as of 2021 there is a village cafe, Millie's, open from Tuesday-Sunday which provides meals and has a small grocery section. There is a large village hall, St Peter's Catholic Church at Stonyhurst College, the Anglican church of St. John the Evangelist, village pubs, St Peter's Guild Club and the local football club.

Schools
In the village is St. Joseph's Roman Catholic Primary School. Like Stonyhurst College the school has a strong Jesuit tradition; it was founded by Richard Shireburn and is under the aegis of the Diocese of Salford whilst being maintained by Lancashire County Council. It is a feeder school for St Augustine's RC High School, Billington and St Cecilia's RC High School, Longridge. The school teaches boys and girls from the ages of 5 to 11 years old. Within it is a pre-school that takes children from the ages of 3 to 5 years old. It is reputed to be the oldest and smallest Jesuit school in the UK.

Hotels and public houses
The village has a hotel and public house called the Shireburn, named after the Shireburn family.

Famous people from Hurst Green
Will Greenwood - England World Cup winning rugby union player was brought up on Smithy Row, Hurst Green, by Sue and Dick Greenwood; the latter was also an England rugby international.

Transport links
There is a bus service connecting Hurst Green to both Longridge and Clitheroe, running in each direction approximately 12 times a day as at summer 2021. In 2016 Lancashire County Council proposed the closing of the bus service. However, this proposal was scrapped due to public reaction.

See also

Listed buildings in Aighton, Bailey and Chaigley
Stonyhurst College
Punch Bowl Inn, Hurst Green

References

External links

Hurst Green walk
Hurst Green website
St John's Church website
Hurst Green Conservation Area Appraisal

Villages in Lancashire
Geography of Ribble Valley
Forest of Bowland